The 1010s BC is a decade which lasted from 1019 BC to 1010 BC.

Events and trends

 1019 BC - Reign of Shalmaneser II ends, succeeded by his son Ashur-nirari IV.
 1013 BC - Ashur-nirari IV is succeeded by his uncle, Ashur-rabi II, who ruled for 41 years, one of the longest reigns of an Assyrian monarch.
 1012 BC—Acastus, Archon of Athens, dies after a reign of 36 years and is succeeded by his son Archippus. 
 A solar eclipse was seen in Ugarit from 6:09 PM to 6:39 PM, May 9, 1012, BC.
 1010 BC—Uzzah, a citizen of Judah, dies, believed to have been smitten by God for violating divine law by touching the Ark of the Covenant.

Significant people
 Siamun, pharaoh of Egypt, is born (approximate date).

References